Full Moon is the eleventh studio album by Charlie Daniels and the eighth as the Charlie Daniels Band, released on July 18, 1980. It produced two hit singles for the band, In America and The Legend of Wooley Swamp. The group dedicated the album to Tommy Caldwell, who had died on 28 April 1980.

Track listing 
All songs composed by the Charlie Daniels Band (Charlie Daniels, Tom Crain, Taz DiGregorio, Fred Edwards, Charles Hayward & James W. Marshall), except where indicated:

 "The Legend of Wooley Swamp" - 4:18
 "Carolina (I Remember You)" - 5:13
 "Lonesome Boy from Dixie" (Crain, Jody Williams) - 4:45
 "No Potion for the Pain" (DiGregorio, Greg Wohlgemuth) - 4:25
 "El Toreador" - 3:26
 "South Sea Song" - 4:32
 "Dance, Gypsy, Dance" (Daniels) - 3:34
 "Money" (Crain) - 3:58
 "In America" - 3:21

Chart performance

Album

Singles

Personnel
The Charlie Daniels Band:
 Charlie Daniels - Guitar, fiddle, vocals
 Tom Crain - Guitar, vocals
 Taz DiGregorio - keyboards, vocals
 Fred Edwards - drums, percussion
 Charles Hayward - Bass
 James W. Marshall - drums, percussion

Additional musicians:
 Bergen White - String arrangements

Production
 Producer: John Boylan
 Engineer: Paul Grupp
 Assisted by: Russ Martin, Phil Jamtaas, Ed Cherney, Cary Pritkin
 Production supervisor: Joseph E. Sullivan
 Special thanks to: Steve Goostree
 Cover illustration: Bill Myers

Catalog number
 Original LP Catalog Number: Epic Records FE 36571
 CD Catalog Number: Epic Records EK 36571

References

1980 albums
Epic Records albums
Charlie Daniels albums
Albums produced by John Boylan (record producer)